Flesh Color (French: Couleur Chair) is a 35 mm film by François Weyergans (Prix Goncourt 2005). Weyergans is one of the forty members known as immortals of the French Academy (L'Académie française). It features a band called Flesh Colour formed in 1976 in Brussels-Capital.

Starring
Dennis Hopper
Veruschka von Lehndorff
Bianca Jagger
Jorge Donn
Laurent Terzieff
Anne Wiazemsky
Roger Blin
Lou Castel

Presentation
This film was presented to the Cannes Film Festival in the parallel section in 1978. It is unreleased.

Flesh Colour – the band
The band is composed of:
Friswa (guitar) from "Jenghis Khan".
Luc Hensill (guitar) from "Tomahawk Blues Band".
Michel Vanstappen (bass) from "John Lauwers Band".
Freddy Nieuland (Drums) from Wallace Collection.
Flesh Color was a rock music group active from 1976 to 1978, formed in Brussels.

Freddy Nieuland, drummer of Wallace Collection, asked Luc Hensill in 1975 to reform with him his band. Luc accepted to start a new band with Freddy. Luc and Freddy asked Friswa to play with them. A friend of Friswa, Michel Van Stappen, came to play the bass guitar. Luc took the new group to the "Stage Night Club" of Forest National. One day, the writer and filmmaker Francois Weyergans invited the group to play music on his new movie "Couleur Chair" (in English: "Flesh Color") with Dennis Hopper. François also asked the group to compose the film music. The band then decided for the first time on a name for their newly formed band, "Flesh Colour", like the film in which they starred.

External links

Luc Hensill Site
Couleur Chair (Flesh Color) on Festival de Cannes
Couleur chair on BiFi

1978 films
French musical films
Films shot in Belgium
Unreleased films
French documentary films
1970s French films